The Crime and Courts Act 2013 (c. 22) is an Act of Parliament of the Parliament of the United Kingdom introduced to the House of Lords in May 2012. Its main purpose is to create the United Kingdom National Crime Agency which replaced the Serious Organised Crime Agency. Part 2 of the Act relaxes the rules on filming court proceedings under controlled circumstances, and amends the rules on 'self-defence'.

It also enacts changes to press regulation in response to the Leveson Inquiry into the ethics and behaviour of the media.

The Act has three parts.

Part 1: The National Crime Agency 

Part 1 has sixteen sections involved in the creation of the National Crime Agency, which the Home Office calls 'a national crime-fighting agency'. The NCA incorporates the Serious Organised Crime Agency, the Child Exploitation and Online Protection Centre and the National Cyber Crime Unit. The Act also abolishes the National Policing Improvement Agency.

Section 13 of Part 1 prohibits any officer of the NCA from calling a strike.

Part 2: Courts and Justice 

Part 2 deals with the administration of law courts in the UK, including measures aimed at increasing the numbers of female judges appointed, and amending regulations on the payment of fines. A single County Court and a single Family Court for England and Wales were created by the Act, to replace the previous system in which there were many local county courts and where the family jurisdiction was divided between magistrates, the county courts and the High Court.

Schedule 12 has five parts related to the appointment of judges to the Supreme Court of the United Kingdom. Section 32 enables filming of court proceedings under controlled circumstances. Former Secretary of State for Justice Kenneth Clarke announced in September 2011 that only sentencing would be broadcast. There has been criticism about the change about the potential "Hollywoodisation" of justice following similar liberalisation moves in Scotland.

Section 33 abolishes "scandalising the judiciary" or "scandalising the court" as a form of contempt of court under common law. The offence has not been prosecuted since 1931, although it had been considered for use in 1999.

Section 40 contains a controversial uncommenced provision that would have required publishers of newspapers and other printed media to meet the costs of unsuccessful libel claimants if they did not register with a suitably recognised media regulator, a provision suggested by the Leveson Inquiry. In March 2018, the government announced that they would not commence this provision and seek to repeal it. This was announced at the same time the government announced that they would not authorise the second part of the Leveson Inquiry into media standards and ethics.

Section 43 amended the law relating to self-defence as a defence to a criminal charge. It introduced into statutory law the so-called "householder defence" by inserting a new sub-section (5A) (and supplementary sub-sections) into section 76 of the Criminal Justice and Immigration Act 2008. This meant that force used against burglars in defence of one's home does not have to be reasonable, provided that it is not "grossly disproportionate." (This section came into force on Royal Assent.)

Section 45 and Schedule 17 of the Act establishes the statutory basis for deferred prosecution agreements under English law. Where previously, attempts to have English courts accept such agreements on the basis of their inherent jurisdiction met with difficulty, post the enactment of this Act, 3 such agreements were concluded in rapid succession.  This included agreements with ICBC bank, and most recently in Jan 2017, Rolls-Royce plc.

Part 3: Miscellaneous and General 

This part deals with various matters including the right to appeal immigration rulings whilst resident in the UK and "drug driving" legislation.  Section 57 amends sections 5 and 6 of the Public Order Act 1986, replacing “, abusive or insulting” in the places where it occurs with “or abusive”. This change was in response to the 'Reform Section 5' campaign.

References

United Kingdom Acts of Parliament 2013
National Crime Agency